is a Japanese hurdler who specialises in the 400 metres hurdles. He won bronze medals at the 2006 Asian Games and 2010 Asian Games in the event.

Personal best

International competition

1Did not compete in the final where Japan won the silver medal

References

External links

Naohiro Kawakita at JAAF 

1980 births
Living people
Japanese male hurdlers
Sportspeople from Kagawa Prefecture
Athletes (track and field) at the 2006 Asian Games
Athletes (track and field) at the 2010 Asian Games
Asian Games medalists in athletics (track and field)
Asian Games silver medalists for Japan
Asian Games bronze medalists for Japan
Medalists at the 2006 Asian Games
Medalists at the 2010 Asian Games
Competitors at the 2003 Summer Universiade